Tom Mentzer (born 15 September 1943) is a Swedish bobsledder. He competed in the four man event at the 1972 Winter Olympics.

References

1943 births
Living people
Swedish male bobsledders
Olympic bobsledders of Sweden
Bobsledders at the 1972 Winter Olympics
Sportspeople from Stockholm
20th-century Swedish people